The following is a list of hutongs in Beijing, People's Republic of China:

 Bada Hutong
 Dongjiaominxiang Hutong, the longest hutong
 Fengfu Hutong
 Guozijian Street
 Jinyu Hutong
 Jiuwan Hutong
 Ju'er Hutong
 Lingjing Hutong, the widest hutong
 Liulichang Street
 Mao'er Hutong
 Nanluoguxiang Hutong
 Qianshi Hutong (Money Market), the narrowest hutong
 Xijiaominxiang Hutong
 Yandai xiejie
 Yichi Dajie (One Foot Street), the shortest hutong
 Zhuanta Hutong (Brick Pagoda Hutong)
 Doufuchi Hutong
 Beiluoguxiang
 Lishi Hutong
 Yancao Hutong
 Yanle Hutong
 Bensi Hutong
 Neiwubu Hutong
 Shijia Hutong
 Ganmian Hutong
 Dongtangzi Hutong
 Xizongbu Hutong
 Xinkailu Hutong
 Beijige Santiao
 Beijige Toutiao
 Suzhou Hutong
 Hougou Hutong
 Chuanban Hutong
 Shoupa Hutong
 Shiban Hutong
 Xiaoxinkai Hutong

External links
 Beijing hutong index
 Most featured hutongs in Beijing

Streets in Beijing
Hutongs
Beijing, hutongs